The Rev. Clifton Kirkpatrick, DMin, is the former Stated Clerk of the General Assembly of the Presbyterian Church (U.S.A.), a position in which he served from 1996 to 2008. Since 2004 he has also served as President of the World Alliance of Reformed Churches.

During his term as Stated Clerk of the PC(USA), Kirkpatrick advocated for the ordination of gays and lesbians. After serving the denomination through twelve years of declining membership, Kirkpatrick chose to step down from his position.

References

External links
 
 Biography from 216th General Assembly

Year of birth missing (living people)
Living people
American religious leaders
American Presbyterians